Kalenić (Serbian Cyrillic: Каленић) is a village in the municipality of Ub in western Serbia. According to the 2011 census, Kalenić had 759 residents.

History
The former village was resettled in 2003, to make room for expansion of coal field "Tamnava" of nearby Kolubara coal mine, centered at Veliki Crljeni). The new village was built few kilometers away, but most residents chose to resettle elsewhere.

A modern regional landfill is planned to be opened at abandoned coal fields near Kalenić in 2013.

References

Populated places in Kolubara District
Šumadija